{{DISPLAYTITLE:N6-Cyclopentyladenosine}}

N6-Cyclopentyladenosine (CPA) is a drug which acts as a selective adenosine A1 receptor agonist. It has mainly cardiovascular effects with only subtle alterations of behavior. CPA is widely used in scientific research into the adenosine receptors and has been used to derive a large family of derivatives.

See also 
 N6-Methyladenosine

References

Nucleosides
Purines
Adenosine receptor agonists
Hydroxymethyl compounds